Pararheinheimera aquatica is a Gram-negative, aerobic, rod-shaped and motile bacterium from the genus of Pararheinheimera which has been isolated from a freshwater culture pond in Taiwan.

References 

Chromatiales
Bacteria described in 2011